Shirin Ab may refer to:
 Shirin Ab, Kermanshah
 Shirin Ab, Andika, Khuzestan Province
 Shirin Ab, Mazu, Andimeshk County, Khuzestan Province
 Shirin Ab, Qilab, Andimeshk County, Khuzestan Province
 Shirin Ab, Dezful, Khuzestan Province
 Shirin Ab, Izeh, Khuzestan Province
 Shirin Ab, Lali, Khuzestan Province
 Shirin Ab, Kurdistan
 Shirin Ab, West Azerbaijan

See also
 Ab Shirin (disambiguation)